Baxter Dury (born 18 December 1971) is an English indie musician, originally signed to Rough Trade Records.

Early life 
Baxter Dury is the son of Ian Dury and his wife Elizabeth "Betty" Rathmell. As a young boy he appeared on the front cover of Dury's album New Boots and Panties!!. He left school at the age of fourteen.

The Ian Dury biopic Sex & Drugs & Rock & Roll (2010) features Bill Milner as Baxter.

Career 
In 2002 Dury's Oscar Brown EP was "Record of the Week" in NME.

In 2014 he signed a new recording contract with PIAS subsidiary Le Label and released a new album It's A Pleasure.

In October 2017 Dury previewed the releases of his first album for Heavenly Recordings with the release of the single "Miami" alongside a video produced by Roger Sargent.

In March 2019 Dury appeared on the Fat White Family single "Tastes Good With The Money", also appearing in the video.

In August 2021 Dury combined with producer Fred Again for the single "Baxter (These Are My Friends)".

Personal life
He has one son, Kosmo Korda Dury (born 2002), whose mother is the granddaughter of Zoltan Korda.

Discography

The discography of Baxter Dury consists of six studio albums, one collaboration album, one compilation album, one extended play and fourteen singles.

Studio albums

Compilation albums
 Mr. Maserati (Best Of Baxter Dury 2001 - 2021) (2021, PIAS Le Label, Heavenly)

Singles and EPs
Oscar Brown EP (2001)
"Gingham Smalls 2" / "Lucifer's Grain" (2002)
"Love in the Garden" (2006)
"Claire" (2011)
"Pleasure" (2014)
"Palm Trees" (2014)
"Miami" (2017)
"Prince of Tears" (2017)
"White Coats" (2018) (with Étienne de Crécy and Delilah Holliday)
"How Do You Make Me Feel?" (2018) (with Étienne de Crécy and Delilah Holliday)
"Slumlord" (2019)
"Carla's Got A Boyfriend" (2019)
"I'm Not Your Dog" (2020)
"Say Nothing" (Remixes) (2020)
"D.O.A" (2021)

References

External links

Living people
1972 births
English male singers
English rock guitarists
English pop guitarists
English male guitarists
British indie rock musicians
Rough Trade Records artists
21st-century English singers
21st-century British guitarists
21st-century British male singers
Heavenly Recordings artists